Parambassis apogonoides, commonly known as the iridescent glassy perchlet, is a species of freshwater fish from Southeast Asia.

References

apogonoides
Freshwater fish of Asia
Fish described in 1851